Tmesisternus lateralis is a species of beetle in the family Cerambycidae. It was described by McLeay in 1886.

References

lateralis
Beetles described in 1886